Pascal Bérubé (born February 16, 1975, in Matane, Quebec) is a Canadian politician and television host. He is the current Member of National Assembly of Quebec for the riding of Matane-Matapédia (formerly Matane) and represents the Parti Québécois. He was appointed interim leader of the party following the October 1, 2018 Québec election in which Jean-François Lisée lost his seat and resigned the leadership.

Berubé studied at Université du Québec à Rimouski and obtained a bachelor's degree in education sciences. He later worked as a coordinator for Matane and La Haute-Gaspesie regional county municipalities and a political aide for the Minister of Education and the Minister of Regions. He was also a television host and researcher at Cogeco in Matane, and the former vice-president of the Fédération étudiante universitaire du Québec.

Bérubé was a candidate for Matane in the 2003 elections but was defeated by the Liberal Candidate Nancy Charest. In 2007, he defeated Charest by just over 200 votes. He was named the PQ's critic in communitarian action but later promoted to the portfolio of financial aid for studies.

He was re-elected in 2012, 2014, 2018, and 2022.

He was nominated Opposition House Leader by Jean-François Lisée in October 2016 and was named interim  leader of the Parti Quebecois on October 9, 2018.

References

External links
 
 Bio from the Parti Québécois website 
 Pascal Bérubé named interim Parti Québécois leader

1975 births
French Quebecers
Living people
Members of the Executive Council of Quebec
Leaders of the Parti Québécois
Parti Québécois MNAs
People from Matane
Université du Québec à Rimouski alumni
21st-century Canadian politicians